John T. Rauch Jr. is a retired United States Air Force major general who served as the chief of safety of the United States Air Force from August 2017 to August 2021. Previously, he was the director of future warfare of the U.S. Air Force.

References

External links

Year of birth missing (living people)
Living people
Place of birth missing (living people)
United States Air Force generals